(this series is also sometimes titled as "Matchless Passion Gozaurer") is a 51-episode animated television series, and third series in the Eldran franchise funded by Tomy and produced by Sunrise. It aired in Japan from March 3, 1993, to February 23, 1994. The story for this entry is that a group of elementary school children are given command of the series' title mecha and their efforts to defend the Earth from the Mechanization Empire (Named the "Machine Empire" in the Filipino dubbed version). It firstly introduces a female pilot, additional pilots and jet mode.

Plot
A year has passed after the Three Great Demons are successfully defeated by Great Ganbaruger. But it is not long that a month has passed when the Mechanization Empire invades the solar system in space, and in a matter of moments they take over and convert Neptune, Uranus, Saturn, Jupiter and Mars into mechanical forms, and now, the next planet they seek to mechanize is Earth. However, Earth's only ancient protector and soldier of light, Eldran, stands in their progress. To fight this new menace he gives three sixth-grade children - Kenichi Minezaki, Hiromi Tachibana and Shinobu Asaoka - a dinosaur-themed mecha each:
Kenichi Minezaki: Mach Ptera
Hiromi Tachibana: Land Stego
Shinobu Asaoka: Thunder Brachio
...the three components of the series' title protagonist mecha, Gosaurer. Eventually, as this entry progresses, two auxiliary mecha - each assigned a pilot - later appear:
Magna Tyranno, piloted by Taro Shirogane
Grantops, piloted by Youji Hiyama

Characters

Grade: 6
 Pilot of: Mach Ptera

Kenichi Minezaki is the sixth-grade pilot of Mach Ptera and main pilot of Gosaurer. His parents run a sports store named "Minezaki Sports". He is an active and cheerful boy who likes to skateboard and is good at sports, but like Jin and Kotaro, he is having academic problem issues. He is friends with Saneyasu and Kazutaka with whom he always plays soccer. However, he is the most annoying troublemaker who always causes lots of fights with Shinobu, Goro, Taro, or anyone else in school. He dreamed that a giant gear crashed onto his home which converted him very strangely after Great Ganbaruger saved Earth months prior. It was at this very one time that he was cursed by the Mechanical Empire into a mechanical cyborg for a few days temporarily for some time, but after a brief and bruised battle with the combined lifeforces and powers of the Four Great Machine Kings' new forme, the Machine Great King, he almost died and did return to being his human self. After a harsher battle between themselves and the Emperor, the most powerful Kikaijin, he graduated from Harukaze Elementary along with the Saurers.

 Grade: 6
 Pilot of: Land Stego
Hiromi Tachibana is the pilot of Land Stego and the conservative son of a klutzy doctor who lives in Harukaze City, a neighboring city to Aozora and Hinobori. He has a hobby for writing and drawing manga.

 Grade: 6
 Pilot of: Thunder Brachio
The first female Eldran pilot who operates Thunder Brachio. A tomboyish sixth-grade girl who often argues with Kenichi. She is learning kendo, and often spars with her grandmother (who is also an arcade gamer).

 Pilot of: Magna Tyranno
Also nicknamed at times as "Kinta" (金太). The judo club member who is refined, yet aggressive and the toughest. Kinta is the pilot of the series' first piloted auxiliary, Magna Tyranno.

 Pilot of: Grantops
An indecisive nerd and teacher's pet, who is a real bookworm and the heir to the elite family, though the Hiyama clan disapprove of this fact. Personally, he has a crush on the Class 6-3's homeroom teacher, Yayoi Yuri. He is the pilot of the Boueigar that soon, on the same episode of its appearance, permanently becomes Grantops, the second piloted auxiliary of the series.

 Grade: 6
 Pilot of: Saurer Jet
The very angry sixth-grade class president of class 6-2 who has a serious demeanor and a very dangerous and explosive temper, which causes him to go on a rampage at school and cause lots of fights with Kenichi and/or anyone else. He is the pilot of Kenichi's, Hiromi's and Shinobu's mecha's special vehicle transportation formation, Saurer Jet.

Also known as "Erie". The leader of the Saurers. Her own Saurer Brace is equipped with a "scramble" command function that instantly triggers the transformation of the Saurers' classroom and most of the school into the command centre and the Saurer Jet, and occupies the main command seat in the command center. She has a big ego, which leads to situations like dragging the Saurers into a movie production to fulfill her dreams of becoming an idol.

The "Professor" of the Saurers. Not only did she help develop Boueigar (Gransaurer) but she also writes the program for King Gosaurer. She is usually poised, but lashes out when she can't handle enough. She thinks failure can sometimes lead to success. Strangely enough, the code looks like Basic, so that may have helped. She also was the one who first worked out the functions of Gosaurer. She is the Kojima family cousin of Tsutomu Kojima, Jin Hyuga's classmate.

A boy who is very good with mechanical things. He helped with the design and construction of Boueigar. He seems to possibly be more than a friend with Takako, often helping her make stuff. His father seems to have some type of job involving into fixing cars.

Also known as "Bon". The second of the "terrible trio" with Kazutaka and Kenichi who wears a blue cap. He is tall for his age.

The third member of Kenichi's trio known as "Chobi". He is a short troublemaker who is good at soccer in school.

The first of the female trio. She is more of a crybaby than Kumiko and Harue. It seems that she has some sort of relationship between her and Taro.

Also known as "Kuuko". The second of the female trio. She was once stalked by Hiromi as a subject for art, but when he gets hurt she gets around her feelings to treat him, and in fact seems to possibly care about him after that. The nurse, as such, among the kids.

The third member of the female trio, her timidity seems to be expressed in her introversion. She is the tallest one in the class, and while Bon seemed to have a crush on her due to her wearing a red raincoat during a very rainy day and so, in the end it appeared to have amounted to nothing, plausibly leaving her as the only one of the three likely not to have a potential boyfriend.

Also known as "One". The bright first-born of the Sato twins who talks a lot.

Also known as "Two". The second-born of the Sato twins.

Also known as "Mabo". An overeater. During the Saurers' stay in the dinosaurs' era, he ends up for a short while adopting a baby dinosaur which hatched from the egg he was about to eat. In the end he has to leave it behind along with the dinosaurs.

A heavyset girl. She takes care of the class's pet, an iguana named Dai, and is kind to animals in general. She even rescued a stray cat who got caught inside Gosaurer when a battle began.

Mecha
Unlike the previous Eldran series, both Gosaurer and Magnasaurer transform from the school itself, rather than launch under the base of school/street, which means the facilities in school are usable, but also means that the armour are extremely weak.

Gosaurer

Pilot: Goro
This form is a special transportation formation of Mach Ptera, Land Stego and Thunder Brachio when the mecha are lanched. The only weapons in operation in this formation are the Thunder Cannons and Jet Vulcan which supply only basic defence. Once the Saurer Jet reaches its destination, Goro triggers the Jet's "Saurer Formation" procedure which disassembles the formation into the components - Saurer Jet has served its purpose each time.
Specs
Length: 48.0 meters
Weight: 124.0 tons
Top Flying Speed: Mach 7
Power Output:

Specs
Height: 34.1 meters
Weight: 38.0 tons
Ground Movement Speed: 120 kilometers per hour
Top Flying Speed: Mach 4.8
Power Output: 
People aboard/operating
Pilot: Kenichi
Support crew:
Masao
Yuka
Ikuyo
Takato
Yoji (Upon the entry of Grantops, Yoji transfers from the support crew to pilot Grantops)

The first of Gosaurer's components, it is the only flight-capable component of the three. It mounts a pair of Gatling guns on the wings called the Brit Vulcans and a pair of slicing blades called the Ptera Slicers. It forms the arms and back (and therefore the wings) of Gosaurer.

Specs
Height: 34.5 meters
Length: 20.5 meters
Weight: 40.5 tons
Ground Movement Speed: 200 kilometers per hour
Top Hovering Speed: 580 kilometers per hour
Power Output: 
People abaoard/operating
Pilot: Hiromi
Support crew:
Saneyasu
Erika
Kumiko
Harue
Taro (Upon the entry of Magna Tyranno, Taro transfers from the support crew to pilot Magna Tyranno)

The second of Gosaurer's components, it can attack with spinning back plates called the Fin Cutters and with missile launchers on the sides of the head called the Stego Launchers. Its support crew is Saneyasu, Erika, Kumiko, Harue, and Taro, until Magnasaurer was found in a volcano. It becomes Gosaurer's main body.

Specs
Height: 58.8 meters
Length: 35.0 meters
Weight: 59.8 tons
Ground Movement Speed: 160 kilometers per hour
Top Hovering Speed: 460 kilometers per hour
Power Output: 
People aboard/operating
Pilot: Shinobu
Support crew:
Kazutaka
Shuzo
The twins, Akemi and Harumi
Goro

The third of Gosaurer's components, its weapons are the mouth-equipped Brachio Needle gatling cannon and the back-equipped Thunder Cannons. It can also withdraw the legs into the body and ram with hover jets. It becomes Gosaurer's legs.

Specs
Height: 44.8 meters
Weight: 120.0 tons
Ground Movement Speed: 960 kilometers per hour
Top Flying Speed: Mach 5.6
Power Output: 
The  of Mach Ptera, Land Stego and Thunder Brachio triggered by Kenichi's Saurer Changer's combination function being initiated. Each component's pilots move to the head-based cockpit, where Kenichi seems to be the main pilot. The components' command centers form a single command center in the middle of Gosaurer's chest.

Weapons and abilities
Weapons
Saurer Cannon  Thunder Brachio's Thunder Cannons are employed as leg-mounted cannons after Gosaurer's formation
Saurer Bunker  Mach Ptera's feet serve as wrist-mounted lined launching claws after Gosaurer's formation, flipping away from view when not yet in use
Saurer Shield  Land Stego's back butterflies open to serve as a shield
Saurer Blade  Gosaurer's sword
Abilities
Saurer Magma Finish  Gosaurer's finishing attack. If the Saurer Blade is not summoned before Kenichi triggers this ability with his Saurer Changer's finisher activation function, the Saurer Blade is summoned during this attack
Saurer Hold  A special energy beam fired by the Saurer Shield over the course of Gosaurer's finishing attack that 'suspends' the target in an energy suspension so that they cannot move, suspending them long enough for the finishing attack to be landed
Water Beam  A chest-crystal-fired energy beam which, as its name symbolizes, enhances in strength and power when used underwater
Saurer Bomber  A chest-crystal-formed crystal punched at the target
Spin Boomerang  The Saurer Shield is used as a boomerang

Specs
Height: 62.5 meters
Weight: 100.0 tons
Ground Movement Speed: 380 kilometers per hour
Power Output: 
Aboard
Pilot: Taro
Weapons and abilities
Weapons
Tyranno Smasher  A pair of torso-mounted laser cannons
Abilities
Tyranno Fire  A breath blast of fire
Tyranno Smash  A body ram attack
When the Saurer Jet's Saurer Formation procedure is triggered and Taro's mecha is combined with the Jet at this time, Taro's mecha reshapes into Magna Tyranno. Its attacks are simple: Tyranno Fire fires a blast of fire from its mouth, Tyranno Smasher is a pair of torso mounted laser cannons, and it bodily rams the enemy when performing Tyranno Smash.

Specs
Length: 42.6 meters
Weight: 98.0 tons
Ground Movement Speed: 820 kilometers per hour
Top Flying Speed: Mach 4.7
Power Output: 
Weapons and abilities
Weapons
Magna Blade  Magnasaurer's sword
Magna Cannon  An arm-mounted cannon for each arm
Abilities
Magna Shot  A blast from each Magna Cannon
Magna Bomber  A chest-crystal-formed crystal is thrown at the enemy like an American football

The  of Magna Tyranno into a robot form.

A special  transformation of Magnasaurer into a back-mounted firing weapon used by Gosaurer, instantly forming  - this is phase 1 of Magnasaurer's finishing attack, Saurer Big Buster; for phase 2, Taro, upon the Magna Buster being charged to fire, locks his Saurer Changer into a special firing-weapon-similar interface which allows Taro to fire the blast (Note: this finishing attack can be fired even without combining with Gosaurer, but this has been done only once in the anime), firing a huge blast from the cannons. It also is this mode initially during launch, as a part of the Saurer Jet. When it is not engaging in battles, it was the part of the school which the stairs, as well as the cookery located.
With the introduction of Magna Tyranno, the Saurer Jet, when being launched, is now formed as the  where Magna Tyranno is called as the Magna Buster during transportation.

Specs
Height: 70.5 meters
Weight: 162.0 tons
Ground Movement Speed: 280 kilometers per hour
Power Output: 
Aboard
Pilot: Yoji
Weapons and abilities
Weapons
Tricera Horn  The horns are launched and are attached to wires
Tricera Launchers  A collection of various missile-launching ports which fire their ammunition in a spread
Abilities
Tricera Arrow  Energy blast from the Tricera Horns
Tricera Fire  A breath blast of fire

Yoji Hiyama is the single pilot who controls all of the three forms. This is the Dinosaur mode of Gransaurer, and the initial mode it is gained in. It has several attacks in this mode:

Specs
Length: 50.3 meters
Weight: 148.0 tons
Top Flying Speed: Mach 8.2
Power Output: 
Weapons and abilities
*Weapons
Gran Launcher  All missile ports available for use for this mode are fired in a spread
Gran Cannon  4 cannons split as two pairs mounted on the hull mounted with each cannon close to each other
Grantops' transportation mode when launched.

Specs
Height: 43.5 meters
Weight: 148.0 tons
Ground Movement Speed: 880 kilometers per hour
Top Flying Speed: Mach 5.2
Power Output: 
Weapons and abilities
Weapons
Gran Launcher  The Tricera Lanchers/Gran Launchers used by Grantops/Gran Jet are usable in this form, used in a spread launch
Big Lancer  Gransaurer's bladed polearm
Abilities
Gran Bomber  A chest-crystal-formed crystal is thrown in a boomerang fashion at the enemy
Saurer Grand Slash  Gransaurer's finishing attack - when the Big Lancer is not summoned before Yoji's Saurer Changer triggers this attack, it is summoned during the attack itself; an energy-formed triceratops' mouth sends the Big Lancer to Gransaurer before flying to the sky and firing a special triangle-shaped energy-formed suspension shot to suspend the target long enough for the attack to be landed - Gransaurer rides the triceratops in the fashion of coming down with the triceratops scattering apart and Gransaurer gliding the rest of the way across the ground to make the attack

The Hot-Blooded Evolution of Grantops into a robot form.

Specs
Height: 70.8 meters
Weight: 366.0 tons
Ground Movement Speed: 1,620 kilometers per hour
Top Flying Speed: Mach 9.8
Power Output: 
The  of Gosaurer, Magnasaurer and Gransaurer. It requires all the Saurers to be on board. The pilots of all three units are transferred to a head-based single cockpit.
Weapons and abilities
Weapons
King Launcher  Grantops'/Gransaurer's Tricera Launchers/Gran Launchers form shoulder-to-upper-arm missile launchers that launch a swarm
King Cannons  Gosaurer's Saurer Cannons, Magnasaurer's Magna Cannons and Gransaurer's Gran Cannons are now used either in a selection of which is used or a full blast of all of the Cannons in chorus
King Blade  King Gosaurer's sword
Abilities
King Fire  It releases fire from the Triceratops head on the chest, can also use an energy blast variant called the King Titan
King Shot  Magnasaurer's Magna Shot is used as a foot-mounted attack
Saurer King Finish  King Gosaurer's finishing attack

In the last episode it can further combine with the every part of the school which extra amour are placed on King Gosaurer, while the usable armaments are reduced to King Blade. The unit itself is called .

Songs

Opening
KEEP ON DREAMING  by Seraphim - a special cast-performed "SAURERS Version" is played starting from the midway point onwards of the episodes

Inserts

Themes
READY GO! Hot-Blooded Strongest King Go-Saurer  by SAURERS

Ending
  by Megumi Hayashibara

Game appearances
Go-Saurer debuted as an entry in the Super Robot Wars series of video games in Super Robot Wars NEO for the Wii along with the other 3 Eldran robots.

External links

1993 anime television series debuts
Children's manga
Dinosaurs in anime and manga
Fictional robotic dinosaurs
School life in anime and manga
Sunrise (company)
TV Tokyo original programming
Eldran series
Super robot anime and manga
Super Robot Wars